Real Pool 2 is a video game developed by Groove Alliance and published by Infogrames for Windows in 2002. It is the sequel to the 1998 video game Real Pool.

Reception

The game received "unfavorable" reviews according to the review aggregation website Metacritic.

References

External links
 

2002 video games
Cue sports video games
Infogrames games
North America-exclusive video games
Video game sequels
Video games developed in the United States
Windows games
Windows-only games